In 2000 Paolo Brescia and Tommaso Principi established the collective OBR to investigate new ways of contemporary living, creating a design network among Milan, London and New York.
After working with Renzo Piano, Paolo and Tommaso have oriented the research of OBR towards the integration artifice-nature, to create sensitive architecture in perpetual change, stimulating the interaction between man and environment.
The team of OBR develops its design activity through public-private social programs, promoting – through architecture – the sense of community and the individual identities.
Today OBR is group open to different multidisciplinary contributors, cooperating with different universities, such as Accademia di Architettura di Mendrisio, Aalto University, Academy of Architecture of Mumbai and Mimar Sinan Fine Art University.
Among the best known works by OBR are the Pythagoras Museum, the New Galleria Sabauda in Turin, the Milanofiori Residential Complex, the Children Hospital in Parma, the Galliera Hospital in Genoa, the Lido of Genoa, the Ex Cinema Roma, the Triennale di Milano Terrace.
The under construction projects by OBR include the Lehariya Cluster in Jaipur, the Jafza Traders Market in Dubai and the Multiuse Complex Ahmad Qasir in Teheran.
OBR's projects have been featured in Venice Biennale of Architecture, Royal Institute of British Architects in London, Bienal de Arquitetura of Brasilia, MAXXI in Rome and Triennale di Milano.
OBR has been awarded with the AR Award for Emerging Architecture at RIBA, the Plusform under 40, the Urbanpromo at the 11° Biennale di Venezia, the honourable mention for the Medaglia d'Oro all'Architettura Italiana, the Europe 40 Under 40 in Madrid, the Leaf Award overall winner in London, the WAN Residential Award, the Building Healthcare Award, the Inarch Award for Italian Architecture and the American Architecture Prize in New York.
Since 2004 OBR has been evolving its design parameters according to the environmental and energy certification LEED (Leadership in Energy & Environmental Design) and since 2009 OBR is partner of the GBC (Green Building Council).

Biography

Arch. Paolo Brescia
Paolo Brescia was born in Chiavari on 6 July 1970.
After his degree in 1996 in Architecture from the Politecnico di Milano, he started in 1998 his collaboration with Renzo Piano Building Workshop.
In 2000 he founded OBR Open Building Research with Tommaso Principi.
Since 2000 he is guest professor in several athenaeums lecturing at Faculty of Architecture of the Università degli Studi di Genova, Politecnico di Milano, Università di Trieste, Luiss, Sapienza Università di Roma, Kent State University, Mendrisio Academy of Architecture, Helsinki Aalto University, Academy of Architecture of Mumbai.
From 2004 to 2005 he was university professor in charge at the Faculty of Industrial Design at the Politecnico di Milano.

Arch. Tommaso Principi
Tommaso Principi was born  Firenze on 20 May 1970.
Before his degree in 1999 in Architecture from the Università degli Studi of Genova, he studied Civil Engineering at Università degli Studi di Bologna and he worked with Renzo Piano Building Workshop.
In 2000 he founded OBR Open Building Research with Paolo Brescia.
Since 2000 he is guest professor in several athenaeums lecturing at Faculty of Architecture of the Università degli Studi di Genova, Politecnico di Milano, Sapienza Università di Roma, Università degli Studi di Bologna, Università di Messina and Kent State University.
In the 2007 he coordinated the International Workshop ICAMP for the Sustainable Developmement of the Area of The Stretto di Messina, Italy.

Projects

Completed
 Terrazza Triennale, Milano, Italy, 2014
 Ex Cinema Roma, Parma, Italy, 2013
 Ospedale dei Bambini, Parma, Italy, 2013
 We House, Lavagna, Italy, 2002
 Uffici Cugnasco, Cuneo, Italy, 2002
 Vema, La Biennale di Venezia, Italy, 2006
 Museo di Pitagora, Crotone, Italy, 2008
 Residenze Milanofiori, Assago, Milano, Italy, 2010
 Galleria Sabauda, Manica Nuova Palazzo Reale, Torino, Italy
 Ospedale dei Bambini, Parma, Italy
 Ponte sul Polcevera, Genova, Italy

Under construction
 KGK, Jaipur, India
 Aeroporto di Reggio Calabria, Italy
 Ex Cinema Roma, Parma, Italy
 Riqualificazione dell'Area ex Nuit, Cesenatico, Italy

Current projects
 Hope City, Accra, Ghana
 Royal Ensign, Jaipur, India
 Lido di Genova, Italy
 Marina Grande, Arenzano, Italy
 Villa Boakye Accra, Ghana
 RAK Financial City Towers, UAE
 Waterfront Genova Levante, Italy
 Masterplan Polo di Funo, Bologna, Italy
 Rive di Bisentrate, Pozzuolo di Martesana, Italy
 Centro Giovani Artigiani, Genova, Italy
 Food & Beverage complex, Zayed City, Cairo, Egypt
 Ex Istituto Dermatologico, Milano, Italy

Competitions
 Comparto Stazioni Varese, Varese, Italy (1° prize), 2016
 Parco Centrale di Prato, Prato  Italy (1° prize), 2016
 Ex Caserma De Sonnaz, Torino (1° prize), 2016
 Metropolis Malta  (2° prize), 2016
 Jafza Trade Market, Dubai  (1° prize), 2015
 MRM, Dubai  (1° prize), 2015
 Cascina Merlata, Milano  (short listed), 2015
 Terrazza Triennale, Milano (1° prize), 2014
 Michelin HQ & RDI, New Delhi  (1° prize), 2014
 Atelier Castello, Milano  (1° prize), 2014
 Bayt Al Fann Jameel, Jeddah  (1° prize), 2014
 Jameel Arts Centre, Dubai  (2° prize), 2013
 Porto Santa Margherita Ligure (1° prize), 2013
 Via XX Settembre, Genova  (1° prize), 2012
 Cesme Waterfront, Turkey  (1° prize), 2012
 Floriopoli  (2° prize), 2012
 Pitagora Museum, Crotone, Italy (1° prize), 2003
 Galleria Sabauda of Palazzo Reale in Torino, Italy (1° prize), 2003
 Sustainable Residential Complex Milanofiori, Milano, Italy (1° prize), 2005
 Fiera Riva del Garda, Italy (short listed), 2006
 Polcevera Bridge, Genova, Italy (1° prize), 2006
 Reggio Calabria Airport, Italy (1° prize), 2006
 Museo di arte nuragica, Cagliari, Italy (short listed), 2006
 Campus Divino Amore, Roma, Italy (1° prize), 2007
 Ex Cinema Roma, Parma, Italy (1° prize), 2007
 Waterfront Reggio Calabria, Italy (2° prize), 2007
 Museo Diocesano, Milano, Italy (3° prize), 2007
 Urbanpromo, Urban Planning Prize, INU, Venice Biennale, Italy (1° prize), 2008
 Xplusform under 40, Italy (1° prize), 2008
 Masterplan Polo di Funo, Bologna, Italy (1° prize), 2009
 Nuova Sede Provincia di Bergamo, Italy (short listed), 2009
 Messina Fair, Italy (1° prize), 2009
 Social Housing, Via Cenni, Milano, Italy (mentioned), 2009
 Nuovo Ospedale Galliera, Genova, Italy (1st prize), 2010
 Shantou University Center, China, 2010
 Olympic Park Master plan, Rio de Janeiro, Brazil, 2011
 Museums of History, Science and Technology, Dalian, China, 2011
 Polo Intermodale of Trieste FVG, Italy (1° prize), 2001

Awards
 RIBA Royal Institute of British Architects, London, AR Awards for Emerging Architecture, honorable mention, London, UK, 2007
 Urbanpromo by INU Istituto Nazionale Urbanistica, Biennale di Venezia, Italy, 2008
 Plusform for realized projects under 40, Catanzaro, Italy, 2008
 Honorable mention for the Gold Medal for Italian Architecture by Triennale di Milano, Italy, 2009
 The European Centre for Architecture Art Design and Urban Studies prize Europe 40 under 40, Madrid, Spain, 2010
 In/Arch Ance Award, Realized architecture by young architect, Roma, Italy, 2011
 Leaf Leading European Architect Forum Award, Residential Building of the Year, London, UK, 2011
 Overall Winner 2011 Leaf Award, London, UK, 2011
 Wan Awards Residential, London, UK, 2011

Exhibitions
 13° Biennale di Venezia di Architettura, Common Ground, Padiglione Italiano, Venezia
 Beyond Media 03, Università di Firenze, Image, Ospedale degli Innocenti, Firenze, Italy, 2003
 Intimacy, iMage, Stazione Leopolda, a cura di Marco Brizzi, Firenze, Italy, 2003
 Graz Biennal on Media and Architecture, ArtImage, Graz, Austria, 2004
 NIB+ICAR travelling 2004, Roma, Glasgow, Belgrado, Helsinki, Finland, 2004
 Temporary, Politecnico di Milano, Teatro Franco Parenti, Milano, Italy, 2004
 2° Festival dell'Architettura, Laboratorio Italia, Parma, Italy, 2005
 Biennale del Paesaggio Mediterraneo, Progetti di Paesaggio nel Mediterraneo, Pescara, Italy, 2005
 V Biennale di Architettura, Contemporary Ecologies. Energies for Italian Architecture, Brasília, Brazil, 2006
 Architecture: Where to, Cross Borders: concepts of a unified Europe/world, London, UK, 2007
 Vivere l'ambiente: città e territorio tra crescita e sostenibilità, Hanoi, Vietnam, 2007
 XI Bienal Internacional de Arquitectura, Buenos Aires, Argentina, 2007
 AR Awards exhibition, Berlin, Germany, 2008
 Arup World Architecture Festival, Barcellona, Spain, 2008
 AR Awards exhibition, Budapest, Hungary, 2008
 Un'estetica del "disordine", Ordine degli Architetti della Provincia di Milano, Italy, 2008
 AR Awards exhibition, Seoul, South Korea, 2008
 Giovani Architetti verso il futuro, Auditorium di Palazzo Rosso, Genova, Italy, 2008
 Medaglia D'Oro all'Architettura Italiana, La Triennale di Milano, Italy, 2009
 40 Under 40, Madrid, Spain, 2010
 Giovani Architetti Italiani, GiArch, Utet, Casa dell'Architettura Roma, Italy, 2010
 Better City, Better Life, World Trade Centre, Shanghai International Expo, 2010
 Dal Lido d'Albaro al Lido di Genova, Confindustria, Genova, Italy, 2010
 Laboratorio di Progettazione Architettonica, OBR, Università di Trieste, Italy, 2010
 Urban Transformation on the Waterfront of Genoa, USI Accademia di Architettura, Mendrisio, Switzerland, 2010
 Spot on Architecture, Milanofiori, Università di Firenze, Italy, 2010
 Giovani Architetti, GiArch, Casa dell'Architettura, Roma, Italy, 2010
 LEED-GBC, Approccio alla sostenibilità nel Real Estate, Genova, Italy, 2011
 Pragmatic Utopias, Aalto University, Helsinki, Finland, 2011
 ASJ TV, New Wave in Architecture, OBR Open Building Research, Tokyo, Japan, 2011
 In/Arch Ance, Roma, Italy, 2011
 Young Blood, Annual dei talenti italiani, Roma, Italy, 2011
 EDII European Design Innovation Initiative, Helsinki, Finland, 2011
 Rassegna Italiana, Università di Roma La Sapienza, Italy, 2011
 Changing Communities: does architecture have the power?, Academy of Architecture, Mumbai, India, 2011
 Bhartiya Kala Prasarini Sabha's, College of Architecture, Pune, India, 2011
 Ordine degli Architetti di Bologna, Saie, Bologna, Italy, 2011
 Rigenerazione Urbana, Catania, Italy, 2011
 Green City International Forum, Genova, Italy, 2011
 Italy Now, Congresso UIA Unione Italiana Architetti, Tokyo, Japan, 2011
 13° Biennale di Venezia di Architettura, Common Ground, Padiglione Italiano, Venezia, 2012
 Medaglia D'Oro all'Architettura Italiana, Triennale di Milano, Milano, 2012
 Workshop Circus Maximus, Roma 3.0, Rome, 2012
 Right to Energy, MAXXI, Roma, 2013
 Cellulae, Salone del Mobile, Milano, 2013

Reference contacts
 2002 	Luigi Prestinenza Puglisi, Tre parole per il prossimo futuro, Edizioni Meltemi, Roma
 2002 	Wallpaper, n° 53, Architects to watch. Who build for the future on Italy's good name, IPC Media Ltd, London
 2003 	D'Architettura, n° 18, F. Motta Editore, Milano
 2003 	Label, n° 17, Architecture: the bright side of the moon, Torino.
 2004 	Wallpaper, n° 70, Architects Directory. The 25 most intriguing architects from all over the world, IPC Media Ltd, London
 2004 	Area, n° 72, Giardino di Pitagora, F. Motta Editore, Milano
 2005 	Costruire, n° 269, Architetti Under Quaranta, Giardini e Museo di Pitagora, Ed. Abitare Segesta, Milano
 2005 	Il Giornale dell'Architettura, n° 32, Cabassi sceglie OBR per le residenze di Milanofiori, U. Allemandi
 2005 	A10, n°3, Media BV, Amsterdam
 2005 	Jonathan Bell, Penthouse Living, Grassi Penthouse, John Wiley & Sons, Brisbane
 2006 	Giovani Architetti Italiani, Young Italian Architects under 40, Progetto Contemporaneo
 2006 	La Repubblica delle Donne, n° 510, Musei, il verde si addice a Pitagora
 2006 	D'Architettura, n° 29, Laboratorio Italia 2006 Roma, Polo Intermodale FVG, Milano
 2006 	Repertorio Variabile, n° 01, Genova nella formazione di una nuova generazione di architetti, Libria Edizioni
 2007 	The Architectural Review, n° 1330, Emerging Architecture, OBR Museum of Pitagora, London
 2007 	Casabella Japan, n° 759, Arnoldo Mondadori Editore, Architects Studio, Japan
 2007 	Domus, n° 900, Fra terra e cielo - Between Earth and Heaven, Editoriale Domus, Milano
 2007 	Progettare, n° 009, Progettare una città sostenibile, Arstudio Edizioni, Repubblica di San Marino
 2007 	Domus, n° 899, Sardegna: i paesaggi del futuro, Editoriale Domus, Milano
 2007 	Ulisse, n° 269, Ecologie Contemporanee
 2007 	Wettbewerbe aktuell, n° 2/2007, Messe und Kongresszentrum Riva del Garda Italien, Freiburg
 2007 	1000 x European Architecture, Verlagshaus Braun, Berlino
 2007 	Wettbewerbe aktuell, n° 1/2007, Museum fur mediterrane nuragische und zeitgenossische Kunst, Stuttgart
 2008 	Il Mondo, Il Corriere della Sera, 24 ottobre 2008, Premio Delmonte
 2008 	Casabella, n°770, Premio Urbanistica 2008, Arnoldo Mondadori Editore, Milano 
 2008 	AA.VV., Young Italian Blood, Annual dei talenti italiani premiati nel mondo, Iron Editore
 2008 	Photon, n° 11, luglio 2008, Photon Magazine, Tokyo, Japan
 2008 	Progettare, n° 14, Città sostenibile, Ecomondo, Arstudio Edizioni, Repubblica di San Marino
 2008 	Il Giornale dell'Architettura, n° 64, Il Science Centre progettato da OBR, U. Allemandi & C., Torino
 2008 	Dwell. Online editor Dwell Magazine, New York, NY
 2008 	1000 x Landscape Architecture, Verlagshaus Braun, Berlin
 2009	Guglielmo Pelliccioli, Real Estate, 30 talenti per il futuro, Daily Real Estate S.r.l., Milano
 2009	Catalogo Medaglia d'Oro all'Architettura Italiana, La Triennale di Milano, Electa, Milano
 2009	Casamica, gennaio/febbraio 2009, Gli Interni Esterni, RCS periodici, Milano
 2010	Luca Paschini, Progetti di giovani architetti italiani, Linea GiArch, Utet Scienze Tecniche, Torino
 2010	Latitudine 45°40’80’’ longitudine 9°15’20’’ Milanofiori Nord, A. Barbara, S. Galateo e L. Molinari, MB editore
 2010	Kent State University, OBR, Ri-naturalizzazione e apertura della città al mare, Alinea editrice, Firenze
 2010	Costruire, 100% under 40, Residenze Milanofiori Nord, Editrice Abitare Segesta S.p.A.
 2010	Il Giornale dell'Architettura, Genova, piastra verde per il nuovo Galliera
 2010	AA.VV., Young Blood 09, Medaglia d'Oro dell'Architettura Italiana, FM editore, Roma
 2010	Roma, Meno è Più, Una nuova sequenza di trasformazioni urbane e architettoniche, LISt Barcellona
 2011	A. Trivelli, Edilizia residenziale innovativa, Progettare l'Housing contemporaneo, Maggioli Editore, Repubblica di San Marino
 2011	Arketipo, giugno 2011, OBR Open Building Research, Milanofiori Nord Residence, Il Sole 24 Ore, Milano
 2011	Pitagora Museum, Architecture Lab, Beirut
 2011     AA.VV., Young Italian Blood 10, Annual dei talenti italiani, FM editore
 2011     Arketipo, giugno 2011, OBR, Milanofiori Nord Residence, Il Sole 24 Ore, Milano
 2011     Bo Yuan International Book Publishing Group, ShenZhen
 2011     A. Trivelli, Edilizia residenziale innovativa, Maggioli Ed., San Marino
 2011     Blueprint, LEAF Awards 2011, December, World Market Intelligence, London
 2012     Lotus International, n° 148, New Urban Housing II, OBR, Milanofiori, Editoriale Lotus, Milano
 2012     Casabella, n° 809, OBR Brescia e Principi, Museo Pitagora, Arnoldo Mondadori Editore, Verona
 2012     David Chipperfield, Common Ground, La Biennale di Venezia, Marsilio Editori, Venezia
 2012     Medaglia d'Oro all'Architettura Italiana, La Triennale di Milano, Editrice Compositori, Bologna
 2012     A+D+M, n° 40, Museo: progetto e programma, Publicomm, Savona
 2012     Carles Llop Torné, Working with the territory, Actar, Barcelona, Basel, New York
 2012     Lowrence Speck, Top International Residential Building, Design Vision Publishing, Hong Kong
 2012     Ecologik, n° 24, Leading Architectural Forum (LEAF), Architecture à vivre, Paris
 2012     Architettura & Design Lombardia, OBR, Residenze Milanofiori, Radl Communication, Milano
 2012     Mimarlik, OBR, Boyut Yayin Grubu, Istanbul
 2012     Casa 24, Maxi Poli Ospedalieri in cantiere, Il Sole 24 Ore, Milano
 2013     Sette, Corriere della Sera, 13 marzo 2013, Le silicon Valley che tengono nel continente le ricchezze, RCS MediaGroup
 2013     La Repubblica, 29 marzo 2013, Le mostre, Architettura, Dal petrolio al postpetrolio, Gruppo Editoriale L'Espresso
 2013     Daily Graphic, 5 March 2013, HOPE City takes off
 2013     BBC, 4 March 2013, HOPE City project
 2013     CNN, 20 March 2013, Africa's tallest building' set for tech city
 2013     Arquired, Arquitectura, Cellulae disenada por OBR para Danese en el salone del mobile 2013
 2013     Il Corriere della Sera, 9 aprile 2013, Una poetica oltre la lampada
 2013     Il Manifesto, 10 aprile 2013, Cultura, La cellula che crea spazio
 2013     La Repubblica, 9 aprile 2013, Ghana, Sei torri genovesi cambiano il volto dell'Africa
 2013     Pippo Ciorra, Energy, Architettura e reti del petrolio e del post-petrolio, Diritto all'Energia, Fondazione MAXXI, Mondadori Electa, Milano

External links

References 

Architecture firms of Italy
Companies based in Genoa
Design companies established in 2000
2000 establishments in Italy